In probability and statistics, the generalized beta distribution is a continuous probability distribution with four shape parameters (however it's customary to make explicit the scale parameter as a fifth parameter, while the location parameter is usually left implicit), including more than thirty named distributions as limiting or special cases. It has been used in the modeling of income distribution, stock returns, as well as in regression analysis. The exponential generalized beta (EGB) distribution follows directly from the GB and generalizes other common distributions.

Definition 
A generalized beta random variable, Y, is defined by the following probability density function:

and zero otherwise. The function B(p,q) is the beta function.

Properties

Moments 
It can be shown that the hth moment can be expressed as follows:

where  denotes the hypergeometric series (which converges for all h if c<1, or for all h/a<q if c=1 ).

Related distributions 
The generalized beta encompasses many distributions as limiting or special cases. These are depicted in the GB distribution tree shown above. Listed below are its three direct descendants, or sub-families.

Generalized beta of first kind (GB1) 
The generalized beta of the first kind is defined by the following pdf:

It is easily verified that

The moments of the GB1 are given by

The GB1 includes the beta of the first kind (B1), generalized gamma(GG), and Pareto as special cases:

Generalized beta of the second kind (GB2) 
The GB2 is defined by the following pdf:

One can verify that

The moments of the GB2 are given by

The GB2 is also known as the Generalized Beta Prime (Patil, Boswell, Ratnaparkhi (1984)), the transformed beta (Venter, 1983), the generalized F (Kalfleisch and Prentice, 1980), and is a special case (μ≡0) of the Feller-Pareto (Arnold, 1983) distribution. The GB2 nests common distributions such as the generalized gamma (GG), Burr type 3, Burr type 12, Dagum, lognormal, Weibull, gamma, Lomax, F statistic, Fisk or Rayleigh, chi-square, half-normal, half-Student's t, exponential, asymmetric log-Laplace, log-Laplace, power function, and the log-logistic.

Beta 
The beta family of distributions (B) is defined by:

Its relation to the GB is seen below:

The beta family includes the beta of the first and second kind (B1 and B2, where the B2 is also referred to as the Beta prime), which correspond to c = 0 and c = 1, respectively. Setting ,  yields the standard two-parameter beta distribution.

Generalized Gamma 
The generalized gamma distribution (GG) is a limiting case of the GB2. Its PDF is defined by:

with the th moments given by

As noted earlier, the GB distribution family tree visually depicts the special and limiting cases (see McDonald and Xu (1995) ).

Pareto 
The Pareto (PA) distribution is the following limiting case of the generalized gamma:

Power 
The power (P) distribution is the following limiting case of the generalized gamma:

Asymmetric Log-Laplace 
The asymmetric log-Laplace distribution (also referred to as the double Pareto distribution ) is defined by:

where the th moments are given by

When , this is equivalent to the log-Laplace distribution.

Exponential generalized beta distribution 

The EGB includes generalizations of the Gompertz, Gumbel, extreme value type I, logistic, Burr-2, exponential, and normal distributions.

Included is a figure showing the relationship between the EGB and its special and limiting cases.

Moment generating function 
Using similar notation as above, the moment-generating function of the EGB can be expressed as follows:

Multivariate generalized beta distribution 

A multivariate generalized beta pdf extends the univariate distributions listed above. The parameter  is assumed to be positive, and define the function  =  for  = .

The pdf of the multivariate generalized beta may be written as follows:

Like the univariate generalized beta distribution, the multivariate generalized beta includes several distributions in its family as special cases. By imposing certain constraints on the parameter vectors, the following distributions can be easily derived.

Multivariate generalized beta of the first kind (MGB1) 

When each  is equal to 0, the MGB function simplifies to the multivariate generalized beta of the first kind (MGB1), which is defined by:

where     .

Multivariate generalized beta of the second kind (MGB2) 

In the case where each  is equal to 1, the MGB simplifies to the multivariate generalized beta of the second kind (MGB2), with the pdf defined below:

when    for all .

Multivariate generalized gamma 

which is the product of independently but not necessarily identically distributed generalized gamma random variables.

Other multivariate distributions 

Similar pdfs can be constructed for other variables in the family tree shown above, simply by placing an M in front of each pdf name and finding the appropriate limiting and special cases of the MGB as indicated by the constraints and limits of the univariate distribution.

Marginal density functions 

The marginal density functions of the MGB1 and MGB2, respectively, are the generalized beta distributions of the first and second kind, and are given as follows:

Applications 
The flexibility provided by the GB family is used in modeling the distribution of:
 distribution of income
 hazard functions
 stock returns
 insurance losses

Applications involving members of the EGB family include:
 partially adaptive estimation of regression models
 time series models
 (G)ARCH models

Distribution of Income 
The GB2 and several of its special and limiting cases have been widely used as models for the distribution of income. For some early examples see Thurow (1970), Dagum (1977), Singh and Maddala (1976), and McDonald (1984).
Maximum likelihood estimations using individual, grouped, or top-coded data are easily performed with these distributions.

Measures of inequality, such as the Gini index (G), Pietra index (P), and Theil index (T) can be expressed in terms of the distributional parameters, as given by McDonald and Ransom (2008):

Hazard Functions 
The hazard function, h(s), where f(s) is a pdf and F(s) the corresponding cdf, is defined by

Hazard functions are useful in many applications, such as modeling unemployment duration, the failure time of products or life expectancy. Taking a specific example, if s denotes the length of life, then h(s) is the rate of death at age s, given that an individual has lived up to age s. The shape of the hazard function for human mortality data might appear as follows: decreasing mortality in the first few months of life, then a period of relatively constant mortality and finally an increasing probability of death at older ages.

Special cases of the generalized beta distribution offer more flexibility in modeling the shape of the hazard function, which can call for "∪" or "∩" shapes or strictly increasing (denoted by I}) or decreasing (denoted by D) lines. The generalized gamma is "∪"-shaped for a>1 and p<1/a, "∩"-shaped for a<1 and p>1/a, I-shaped for a>1 and p>1/a and D-shaped for a<1 and p>1/a. This is summarized in the figure below.

References

Bibliography
 C. Kleiber and S. Kotz (2003) Statistical Size Distributions in Economics and Actuarial Sciences. New York: Wiley
 Johnson, N. L., S. Kotz, and N. Balakrishnan (1994) Continuous Univariate Distributions. Vol. 2, Hoboken, NJ: Wiley-Interscience.

Continuous distributions